Luis David Velázquez Jiménez (born 29 December 1984) is a Mexican former footballer, who last played as a defender for Altamira in the Primera División de Mexico Liga de Ascenso, the third and last level of professional football (soccer) in Mexico.

Velázquez began his career in 2004 at Pioneros de Ciudad Obregon (Pioneers of Obregon City). That same year, he signed with Dorados de Sinaloa. After Dorados relegated to Primera División A, he went to Club León. After playing there for many seasons, Luis David returned to Primera División Atlante F.C.

References

External links
 
 

Living people
1984 births
Liga MX players
Atlante F.C. footballers
Dorados de Sinaloa footballers
Club León footballers
Association football defenders
Footballers from Veracruz
Mexican footballers